Thomas "Rudy" Abrams (born January 14, 1942) is a former American football coach. He served as the head football coach at Livingstone College in Salisbury, North Carolina from 1994 to 1998 and North Carolina Central University in Durham, North Carolina from 1999 to 2002.

Abrams lettered in football for four years at Livingstone before graduating in 1964 with a Bachelor of Science degree in business education. He began his coaching career in 1964 as an assistant at York Road Junior High school in Charlotte, North Carolina. From 1969 to 1971, he was an assistant at Myers Park High School, also in Charlotte, mentoring the running backs and wide receivers under head coach Gus Purcell. In 1972, Abrams was appointed as the head football coach at West Charlotte High School. He led West Charlotte to a record of 49–33–1 in eight seasons, highlighted by Southwestern 4-A Conference titles in 1976 and 1978, and a second-place finish in the state in 1978. He left West Charlotte in 1980 to become head coach at cross-town rival Garinger High School, leading Garginer to a record of 2–8 in one season before resigning.

After two years as an assistant coach at Johnson C. Smith University, Abrams was named head football coach at East Mecklenburg High School, also in Charlotte, in 1983.

Head coaching record

College

References

1942 births
Living people
Johnson C. Smith Golden Bulls football coaches
Livingstone Blue Bears football coaches
Livingstone Blue Bears football players
North Carolina Central Eagles football coaches
High school football coaches in North Carolina
African-American coaches of American football
African-American players of American football
20th-century African-American sportspeople
21st-century African-American people
20th-century African-American people